Queen's Birthday Honours are announced on or around the date of the Queen's Official Birthday in Australia, Canada, New Zealand and the United Kingdom. The dates vary, both from year to year and from country to country. All are published in supplements to the London Gazette and many are conferred by the monarch (or her representative) some time after the date of the announcement, particularly for those service people on active duty.

The 1982 Queen's Birthday Honours list for the United Kingdom was issued on 11 June 1982 and the lists for Australia, New Zealand, and Fiji were issued on 12 June 1982.

United Kingdom

Life Barons and Baronesses
Miss Elizabeth Patricia Carnegy, Chairman, Manpower Services Commission, Committee for Scotland. 
Joseph Gormley, O.B.E. Lately President, National Union of Mineworkers. 
Sir Raymond William Pennock. Formerly President, Confederation of British Industry.

Privy Counsellors
Robert Washington, The Earl Ferrers, Minister of State, Ministry of Agriculture, Fisheries and Food. 
James Hector Northey (Hamish) Gray, M.P., Minister of State, Department of Energy. Member of Parliament for Ross and Cromarty. 
Bryant Godman Irvine, M.P., lately First Deputy Chairman of Ways and Means and a Deputy Speaker, Member of Parliament for the Rye Division of East Sussex.

Knights Bachelor
Gordon Johnson Borrie, Director General, Office of Fair Trading. 
George Roland Chetwynd, C.B.E., Chairman, Northern Regional Health Authority. 
David English, Editor in Chief, Associated Newspapers, Editor Daily Mail. 
Basil Samuel Feldman. For Political Service in Greater London. 
Leslie Fowden, Director, Rothamsted Experimental Station, Harpenden. 
Professor Lawrence Burnett Gowing, C.B.E. For Services to Art. 
Peter James Frederick Green, Chairman of Lloyd's. 
Fred Hardman, M.B.E. For Political and Public Service. 
Paul Lancelot Hawkins, T.D., M.P. For Political and Public Service. 
John Austin Hungerford Leigh Hoskyns, Formerly Head of the Prime Minister's Policy Unit. 
(John) Robin Ibbs, lately Head of the Central Policy Review Staff, Cabinet Office. 
Geoffrey Johnson Smith, M.P. For Political and Public Service. 
Christophor Charles Fraser Laidlaw, Chairman, International Computers Ltd. 
Ian Alexander McGregor, C.B.E. For services to Tropical Medicine. 
Maitland Mackie, C.B.E. For public services in Scotland. 
Denis Alfred Marshall, President of The Law Society of England and Wales. 
Walter Charles Marshall, C.B.E., Chairman, United Kingdom Atomic Energy Authority. 
Peter McLay Mills, M.P. For Political and Public Service. 
Professor John Harold Plumb, Historian. 
(James) Gordon Robson, C.B.E., Professor of Anaesthetics, Royal Postgraduate Medical School, University of London. 
Lawrence William Robson. For Political and Public Service. 
Walter Hans Salomon, Founder and Treasurer of "Young Enterprise". 
John Reynolds Mayhew-Sanders, Chairman, John Brown plc. For services to Export. 
William Arthur Shapland, Chairman, Blackwood Hodge plc. 
Michael Norman Shaw, D.L., M.P. For Political and Public Service. 
Jack Smart, C.B.E., Chairman, Association of Metropolitan Authorities. 
Alan Smith, C.B.E., D.F.C, D.L., Chairman and Chief Executive, Dawson International plc. 
William Oulton Wade. For Political and Public Service in North West England. 
Ian James Wallace, C.B.E. For Political Service in the West Midlands.

Diplomatic Service and Overseas List 
Clement Athelston Arrindell, Governor of St Kitts-Nevis.

Australian States 
State of Queensland
Jack Frederick Leggo, D.F.C. For services to motoring and the community.

The Most Honourable Order of the Bath

Knight Grand Cross of the Order of the Bath (GCB) 
Admiral Sir John Fieldhouse, K.C.B. 
General Sir John Stanier, K.C.B., M.B.E., A.D.C. Gen., Colonel Commandant Royal Armoured Corps, Colonel The Royal Scots Dragoon Guards (Carabiniers and Greys). 
Air Chief Marshal Sir Keith Williamson, K.C.B., A.F.C., Royal Air Force. 
Sir Peter Willoughby Carey, K.C.B., Permanent Secretary, Department of Industry.

Knight Commander of the Order of the Bath (KCB) 
Vice Admiral Simon Alastair Cassillis Cassels, C.B.E. 
Vice Admiral John Michael Holland Cox. 
Lieutenant General Sir Steuart Pringle, Bt.
Lieutenant General Alexander Crawford Simpson Boswell, C.B.E., (397816), Colonel The Argyll and Sutherland Highlanders (Princess Louise's). 
Lieutenant General Edward Arthur Burgess, O.B.E., (393092), Colonel Commandant Royal Regiment of Artillery. 
Lieutenant General Robert Francis Richardson, C.V.O., C.B.E., (408020), Colonel The Royal Scots (The Royal Regiment). 
Lieutenant General Richard Brooking Trant, C.B., (383269), Colonel Commandant Royal Regiment of Artillery, Colonel Commandant Royal Army Educational Corps. 
Air Marshal Ian Maurice Pedder, O.B.E., D.F.C., Royal Air Force. 
Trevor Poulton Hughes, C.B., Permanent Secretary, Welsh Office. 
George Walker Moseley, C.B., Permanent Secretary, Department of the Environment. 
William Sinclair Ryrie, C.B., Second Permanent Secretary, H.M. Treasury.

Companion of the Order of the Bath (CB)
Military Division
Rear Admiral Robert Michael Burgoyne. 
Rear Admiral Alexander Peter Comrie. 
Surgeon Rear Admiral (D) Philip Reginald John Duly, O.B.E., Q.H.D.S. 
Rear Admiral John Bethell Hervey, O.B.E. 
Major General Derek Boorman (411897), late The Staffordshire Regiment (The Prince of Wales's). 
Major General Trevor Stuart Hart, Q.H.P. (417772), late Royal Army Medical Corps. 
Major General William Michael Ellis Hicks, O.B.E. (393169), late Coldstream Guards. 
Major General Patrick Herbert Lee, M.B.E. (397961), late Corps of Royal Electrical and Mechanical Engineers. 
Major General Christopher John Popham (362368), late Corps of Royal Engineers. 
Major General William Nigel James Withall (414720), late Corps of Royal Engineers. 
Air Vice-Marshal John Bernard Fitzpatrick, Royal Air Force. 
Air Vice-Marshal Walter John Herrington, Royal Air Force (Retired). 
Air Vice-Marshal Henry Reed-Purvis, O.B.E., Royal Air Force Regiment. 
Air Vice-Marshal Michael Maurice Jeffries Robinson, Royal Air Force.

 Civil Division
James Frederick Barnes, Deputy Chief Scientific Adviser (Projects), Ministry of Defence. 
Kenneth Anthony Bradshaw, Clerk Assistant, House of Commons. 
Lawrence Henry Brandes, lately Under Secretary, Department of Education and Science. 
John Cormack, Under Secretary, Department of Agriculture and Fisheries for Scotland. 
Philip Cousins, Deputy Secretary, Exchequer and Audit Department. 
David Levric Davies, O.B.E., lately Under Secretary, H.M. Procurator General and Treasury Solicitor's Department. 
Duncan Sheppey Davies, lately Chief Engineer and Scientist, Department of Industry. 
James David Fergusson, Assistant Comptroller, Patent Office. 
John Waterston Furness, Under Secretary, Department of Transport. 
Peter Graham, Parliamentary Counsel. 
Julian George Kelsey, Deputy Secretary, Ministry of Agriculture, Fisheries and Food. 
Alfred Walter Mabbs, lately Keeper of Public Records. 
Stanley Walter Midwinter, Under Secretary, Department of the Environment. 
Peter Rogerson Oglesby, Deputy Secretary, Department of Health and Social Security. 
William George Henry Quigley, Permanent Secretary, Department of Finance and Personnel, Northern Ireland. 
Derek Rippengal, Q.C., Counsel to the Chairman of Committees, House of Lords. 
Keith Henry Westcott Thomas, O.B.E., Chief Executive, Royal Dockyards, Ministry of Defence. 
Reginald Norman Williams, Under Secretary, Department of Health and Social Security.

Australian States 
State of Western Australia
Robert David Davies, C.V.O., R.D., J.P. For public service.

Order of St Michael and St George

Knight Grand Cross of the Order of St Michael and St George (GCMG)
Sir Curtis Keeble, K.C.M.G., H.M. Ambassador, Moscow.

Knight Commander of the Order of St Michael and St George (KCMG)
Sir Antony Acland, K.C.V.O., C.M.G., Permanent Under-Secretary of State, Foreign and Commonwealth Office and Head of H.M. Diplomatic Service. 
Julian Leonard Bullard, C.M.G., Foreign and Commonwealth Office. 
Richard Edmund Clement Parsons, C.M.G., H.M. Ambassador, Madrid. 
Richard James Stratton, C.M.G., British High Commissioner, Wellington. 
John Robert Williams, C.M.G., British High Commissioner, Nairobi.

Companion of the Order of St Michael and St George (CMG)
His Honour William Arnold Sime, M.B.E., Q.C., lately Senior Judge, Sovereign Base Areas Administration, Cyprus. 
Andrew Thomas Wilson, Assistant Secretary, Overseas Development Administration.
Nicholas John Barrington, C.V.O., Head of British Interests Section, Royal Swedish Embassy, Tehran. 
Michael Crowley Crowley-Milling, lately Director, LEP Project, Centre for European Nuclear Research, Geneva. 
Alexis Porter, O.B.E., Counsellor, H.M. Embassy, Paris. 
The Honourable Eustace Hubert Beilby Gibbs, Foreign and Commonwealth Office, H.M.Vice-Marshal of the Diplomatic Corps. 
David Howe Gillmore, Foreign and Commonwealth Office. 
Christopher Leslie George Mallaby, Minister-designate, H.M. Embassy, Bonn. 
Peter Malcolm Maxey, H.M. Ambassador, East Berlin. 
Michael Ramsay Melhuish, Counsellor, H.M. Embassy, Warsaw. 
Michael John Newington, H.M. Consul-General, Düsseldorf. 
Terence David O'Leary, British High Commissioner, Freetown. 
Michael Keith Orlebar Simpson-Orlebar, Minister, H.M. Embassy, Rome. 
Duncan Slater, H.M. Ambassador, Muscat. 
David Churchill Thomas, H.M. Ambassador, Havana.

Australian States 
State of South Australia
Robert Leo Seppelt. For service to the wine industry.

Royal Victorian Order

Dame Grand Cross of the Royal Victorian Order (GCVO)
The Most Noble Mary Kathleen, The Dowager Duchess of Abercorn, D.C.V.O.

Dame Commander of the Royal Victorian Order (DCVO)
The Honourable Mary Anne Morrison, C.V.O.

Knight Commander of the Royal Victorian Order (KCVO)
Lieutenant-Colonel Simon Claud Michael Bland, C.V.O. 
Lieutenant Commander Peter Richard Buckley, C.V.O., Royal Navy. 
Henry George Reginald Molyneux, Lord Porchester, K.B.E., D.L. 
Richard Lyall Sharp, C.B.

Commander of the Royal Victorian Order (CVO)
Lady Mary Katherine Fitzalan-Howard, M.V.O. 
George Albert Harris, M.V.O., M.B.E. 
Colin Vyvyan Peterson, 
John Edward Powis Titman, M.V.O.

Member of the Royal Victorian Order (MVO)
Francis Sedley Andrus. 
Commander John Hamilton Cracknell, Metropolitan Police. 
Leonard Geale Dickson. 
Alain Chartier Edmond Joly de Lotbinière. 
Major Nicholas Skerratt Lawson. 
Commander John Henry Stuart Mcanally, Royal Navy. 
Commander Richard Nicholas Margrave Paige, Royal Navy. 
Sydney Richards. 
Peter Scott Dunn. 
Captain Ashe George Russell Windham, Irish Guards.
Graham Henry Bish. 
Anthony Joseph Charlton. 
Chief Yeoman Warder Robert Hugh Harton. 
Miss Susan Louise Hay. 
Captain (Local Major) Graham Anthony Clifford Hoskins, Royal Marines. 
Margaret Hannah, Mrs. Kennerley. 
John Alexander Murray. 
Derek Roy Mackay Ottowell. 
Arthur John William Scovell.

Royal Victorian Medal (RVM)

Royal Victorian Medal (Silver)
Miss Margaret Rachel Coleman. 
Frederick William Henry George Cottrell. 
Sergeant Major Charles Frank Edward Crickmore, The Queen's Bodyguard of the Yeomen of the Guard. 
Richard Laurence Day. 
Police Constable James Hazeldine, Metropolitan Police. 
Lionel Thomas Mann. 
Yeoman Bed Hanger Frederick George Marsh, M.B.E., The Queen's Bodyguard of the Yeomen of the Guard. 
Humphrey Massey. 
Rene Henri Meylan. 
Yeoman Bed Hanger James Peart, The Queen's Bodyguard of the Yeomen of the Guard. 
Sergeant Major Frank George Pickford, The Queen's Bodyguard of the Yeomen of the Guard. 
Police Constable John Pillans, Metropolitan Police. 
Patrick Ryan. 
Arthur George Wakefield. 
Chief Technician Brian James Walton, Royal Air Force.

Companion of Honour
Professor Sir Karl Raimund Popper. For services to philosophy.

Order of the British Empire

Knight Commander of the Order of the British Empire (KBE)
Military Division
 Air Marshal David William Atkinson, Royal Air Force.

Commander of the Order of the British Empire (CBE)
Military Division
Royal Navy
Commodore Samuel Clarke Dunlop, M.B.E., Royal Fleet Auxiliary.
Captain William Stanley Gueterbock, A.D.C., Royal Navy.
The Right Reverend Monsignor Vaughan Frederick John Morgan, V.G.,Royal Navy.
Captain John Patrick Bruce O'Riordan, Royal Navy. .

Army
Brigadier Ian Alexander Christie, O.B.E., M.C. (443414), late The King's Own Scottish Borderers. 
Brigadier Michael Frederick Hobbs, O.B.E. (447271,) late Grenadier Guards.
Colonel Leslie John Philip Morrish (437126), late The Royal Hampshire Regiment.
Brigadier Noel Thomas Anthony Ridings (438306), Royal Pioneer Corps.
Reverend Robin Roe, M.C., Chaplain to the Forces 1st Class (445206), Royal Army Chaplains' Department (now R.A.R.O.).
Brigadier William Paine Sheppard, M.C, T.D., D.L. (403682), late Yorkshire Volunteers, Territorial Army (now R.A.R.O.).
Brigadier John Francis Thomas, O.B.E. (346187), Corps of Royal Military Police.
Brigadier Anthony Chester Vivian (422472), late The Royal Welch Fusiliers.
Colonel Keith Stephen Barnard Wintle, O.B.E. (412103), late Royal Regiment of Artillery.

Royal Air Force
Air Commodore Geoffrey Bryning Tyler, M.B.E., Royal Air Force.
Group Captain Michael John Pilkington, Royal Air Force.
Group Captain Michael James Douglas Stear, Royal Air Force.
Group Captain William John Wratten, A.F.C., Royal Air Force.

Civil Division
Clifford Wallace Adam, Senior Principal Inspector of Taxes, Board of Inland Revenue.
Cyril James Anderton, Q.P.M., Chief Constable, Greater Manchester Police.
John Malcolm Barr, Chairman, Barr and Wallace Arnold Trust pic.
Alec Victor Bedser, O.B.E. For services to Cricket.
Harry Peter Neville Benson, M.C., lately Chairman, A.P.V. Holdings pic. For services to Export.
Miss Jeanne Mary Bisgood, Chairman, Dorset Education Committee.
David Blacktop, O.B.E., Commandant, Fire Service College.
Neville Bruce Alfred Bosworth, Leader, Birmingham City Council.
George Stephen Brosan, T.D., Director, North East London Polytechnic.
Anthony Frederick Burbidge, M.B.E., Senior Technical Adviser, Ministry of Defence.
Denis James Burrell, Managing Director, Martin Baker Aircraft Company Ltd. For services to Export.
John Blackstock Butterworth, D.L., Vice-Chancellor, University of Warwick.
John Bell Cameron, President, National Farmers' Union of Scotland.
John Freeman Chatfield. For Political and Public Service in South East England.
Guy Tresham Checketts, Chairman, South East Asia Trade Advisory Group, British Overseas Trade Board. For services to Export.
Francis Kenneth Chorley, Deputy Chairman and Managing Director, Plessey Electronics Systems Ltd. For services to Export.
Professor Robert Francis Churchhouse, For services to the teaching of computer science.
William Arthur Conlon, M.B.E. For services to young people in Northern Ireland.
Frederick Howard Michael Craig-Cooper, T.D. For Political Service in London.
Ivor John Croft, Assistant Secretary, Home Office.
William Scott Crosby, lately Chairman, Grampian Health Board.
Michael James Stephen Cubbage, M.B.E., lately General Manager, Printing Works, Bank of England.
William Keith Davidson. For services to Medicine in Scotland.
David Lewis Davies, Chairman, The Attendance Allowance Board.
Brian John Fiddes, Assistant Secretary, Scottish Education Department.
Stanley Alfred Field, President, William Baird pic.
George Malcolm Ford, Member, The British National Oil Corporation.
Godfrey St. George Montague Gompertz. For services to the Anglo-Korean Society.
Anthony Gross (Imre Anthony Sandor Gross), Artist.
Abner Borthwick Hadden, Senior Principal Inspector of Taxes, Board of Inland Revenue.
Fred Brian Harrison, Board Member, National Coal Board.
Harry Cyril Harrison, Chairman, Simon Engineering Ltd. For services to Export.
James Burns Hawthorne, Controller, Northern Ireland, British Broadcasting Corporation.
John Stacpoole Haycraft. For services to Language Education.
Leslie Edwin Henderson, Director Middle Band, Department of the Environment.
Stuart Alan Bulmer Heppell, City Architect, Manchester.
Arthur James Herbert. For Political and Public Service in Eastern England.
Jack Hill, Chairman, John Williams Foundries Ltd. For services to the Foundry Industry Training Committee.
Joseph Hood. For Political and Public Service in North West England.
James Thomas Ireland, D.L. For services to local government and the community in Buckinghamshire.
David Jack, Research and Development Director, Glaxo Holdings Ltd.
William George Jewers, O.B.E., Member for Finance, British Gas Corporation.
John Arthur Charles Kelsey, Assistant Secretary, Lord Chancellor's Department.
Charles Alfred Kirkman, lately Under Secretary, Medical Research Council.
John William Laws, Director of Radiology, King's College Hospital, London.
Rosamond Nina Lehmann, (The Honourable Mrs. Philipps), Writer.
William Gerald Eric Lewis, Deputy Chief Scientific Officer, Ministry of Defence.
Farquhar Macintosh, Chairman, Scottish Examination Board.
Donald McLean, Director, Scotland, Rolls-Royce Ltd.
Daniel Maskell, O.B.E. For services to Lawn Tennis.
Colonel John George Mathieson, T.D., D.L., lately Chairman, Highland Territorial, Auxiliary and Volunteer Reserve Association.
John Drake Matthews, Professor of Forestry, University of Aberdeen.
Brian Alfred Maynard, lately Chairman, Advisory Committee on Local Government Audit.
John Phillimore Mitchell, T.D., Professor of Surgery, University of Bristol.
Douglas Wellesley Morrell, Deputy Managing Director, Racal Electronics Ltd.
The Right Honourable Charles Edward, Baron Mowbray and Stourton. For Political Service.
David Nicholas, Editor and Chief Executive, Independent Television News.
Joseph Alexander Patton, lately President, Ulster Farmers' Union.
Daniel Norton Idris Pearce, T.D. For Political Service.
Peter John Pearson, Chairman, Central Horticultural Committee, National Farmers' Union. 
Roger James Pincham, For Political Service. 
Miss Margaret Berenice Price, Singer.
Ralph Alexander Raphael, Professor of Organic Chemistry, University of Cambridge.
John Armstrong Raven, Chief Executive, Simplification of International Trade Procedures Board. For Services to Export.
Joan Marguerite, Mrs. Reeve. For Political Service in the North of England.
Sydney Verdun Robinson, lately Director, Ranks Hovis McDougall pic.
The Honourable Miriam Louisa Rothschild (The Honourable Mrs. Lane). For services to taxonomy.
Stanley John Sadie, Musicologist and Critic, Editor, The New Grove Dictionary of Music and Musicians.
John Stephen Sadler, Member, Monopolies and Mergers Commission.
Narindar Saroop. For Political service.
Peter Francis Scott. For public services in Cumbria.
Nigel Snodgrass. For services to veterinary medicine.
Michael David Snoxall, Head of Legal Services, Unilever pic.
Francis Sullivan, Assistant Secretary, Office of the Parliamentary Commissioner for Administration, Northern Ireland.
Frank Martin Hussey Taylor. For Political Service.
William Taylor, Director, University of London Institute of Education.
Wyndham Thomas, General Manager, Peterborough New Town Development Corporation. 
Alexander Cuthbert Turnbull, Nuffield Professor of Obstetrics and Gynaecology, University of Oxford.
Madeleine Freda, Mrs. Vaughan, O.B.E. For services to local government in West Glamorgan. 
Sammy Wainwright, Deputy Chairman, The Post Office and Managing Director, National Girobank.
Philip John Walker, Assistant Secretary, Department of Energy.
John Sackfield Wallwork, lately Managing Director, Northcliffe Newspapers Group Ltd. 
William Watson, Professor of Chinese Art and Archaeology, University of London.
Miss Dorothy May Webster, President, Royal College of Midwives.
Brian Weigh, Q.P.M., Chief Constable, Avon and Somerset Constabulary.
David Thomson West, Assistant Secretary, Department of Employment.
David Williamson, lately Keeper of the Registers of Scotland.
Ronald Marshall Wilson, Partner, Bell-Ingram, Perth.
Miss Priscilla Helen Ferguson Young, Director, Central Council for Education and Training in Social Work.

Diplomatic Service and Overseas List
William Bailey. O.B.E., D.S.C., G.M. For services to British commercial interests in Portugal. 
Edward Fitzgerald Brenan, M.C. For services to Anglo-Spanish cultural relations.
Robert Webster Ford, H.M. Consul-General, Geneva.
Victor Alfred Ladd, Commissioner for Inland Revenue, Hong Kong.
Theodore Lionel Mander. For services to British commercial interests in New York.
Derek Maxwell March, O.B.E., Senior British Trade Commissioner, Hong Kong.
Miss Felice Morgenstern, lately Assistant Legal Adviser, International Labour Organisa- tion, Geneva.
Michael Graham Ruddock Sandberg. For public services in Hong Kong.
Archibald Zimmern, Justice of Appeal, Hong Kong.

Australian States
State of Queensland
Commander David John Robertson, Royal Australian Navy (Retired). Private Secretary to the Governor.

State of South Australia
William Allan Rodda, M.P. For service to politics.

State of South Australia
Ella Osborn, Mrs. Fry. For service to the arts.

Officer of the Order of the British Empire (OBE)
Military Division
Royal Navy
Commander Michael Cecil Boyce, Royal Navy. 
Commander David John Dacam, Royal Navy. 
Captain Robert Michael Eddleston, R.D.*, A.D.C., Royal Naval Reserve.
Commander Edward David Michael Floyd, Royal Navy.
Commander Brian Herbert Green, Royal Navy. 
Major Christopher James Hickinbotham, Royal Marines.
Commander John Hickson, Royal Navy. 
Commander Victor David Jefferson, Royal Navy.
Commander Arthur David Colquhoun Lund, Royal Navy.
Commander Roger Wilfred Morris, Royal Navy. 
Lieutenant Colonel Samuel Pope, Royal Marines. 
Commander Ronald Shannan Stevenson, Royal Navy.
Commander John Bryan Young, Royal Navy.

Australia

Order of Australia

Knight of the Order of Australia (AK)
Charles Walter Michael Court KCMG OBE - For services to politics and to government.

Companion in the General Division of the Order of Australia (AC)
Robert John Walsh AO OBE

Knight Bachelor
Donald Dean von Bibra CMG, OBE. For service to primary industry and the community.
Laurence Charles Brodie-Hall, CMG. For service to the mining industry.
James Keith Campbell, CBE. For service to commerce, industry and the community
Neil Smith Currie, CBE. For public service.
The Honourable Mr. Justice Joseph Patrick George Kniepp. For service to education and the community.
Eric James Neal. For service to industry.
The Honourable Mr Justice Albert Edward Woodward, OBE. For public service.

Order of the Bath

Companion of the Order of the Bath (CB)
Civil Division
Roy James Cameron. For public service.

Order of Saint Michael and Saint George

Knight Commander of the Order of St Michael and St George (KCMG)
The Honourable Denis James Killen, MP. For parliamentary service.

Companion of the Order of St Michael and St George (CMG)
Keith Hedley Cousins. For service to the advertising industry and the community.
Professor Derek John Mulvaney. For service to education.
Dr Bernard McCarthy O'Brien. For service to medicine, in the field of microsurgery.
Brian John Sweeney. For service to the arts.
Frank Lionel Watts, MBE. For service to the disabled.

New Zealand

Barbados

Knight Bachelor
Professor Kenneth Livingstone Standard, C D., Head of the Department of Social and Preventive Medicine, University of the West Indies.

Fiji

Order of Saint Michael and Saint George

Companion (CMG)
 Josevata Nakausabaria Kamikamica. For public and community service.

Order of the British Empire

Commander (CBE)
Civil division
 Adrian Rood Tarte. For service to the copra industry and the community.

Military division
 Brigadier Robert Ian Thorpe – Commander, Royal Fiji Military Forces.

Officer (OBE)
Civil division
 Dr Alan Harry Penington – Tuberculosis Control Officer Central.
 Uday Singh . For community service.
 Adi Litia Tavanavanua. For services to women.

Military division
 Lieutenant Colonel Edward Kikau Tuivanuavou – 1st Battalion, Fiji Infantry Regiment.

Member (MBE)
Civil division
 Parmanand Paul Jaduram – mayor of Labasa.
 Lai Mohammed. For service to the community.
 Ratu Tevita Dikedike Qioniwasa. For service to the community.
 Inoke Vakataraisulu Tabualevu – Director of Youth and Sport.

Military division
 Warrant Officer Class II Nacani Korovulavula – Royal Fiji Military Forces.
 Warrant Officer Class II Serupepeli Tagivakatini – Royal Fiji Military Forces.

British Empire Medal (BEM)
Civil division
 Alipate Bale Davelevu – supervisor in charge, Rural Water Supplies, Public Works Department.
 Jainul Haq – senior technical officer, Public Works Department.

Military division
 Staff Sergeant Ilisoni Raileqe – 3rd Battalion, Fiji Infantry Regiment (Territorial Force).

Mauritius

Knight Bachelor
Cassam Ismael Moollan, Q.C., Chief Justice.

Order of the British Empire

Commander (CBE)
Civil division
Ahmed Abdulla Ahmed, For services to commerce and industry.
Joseph Claude Alain Noel. For service to agronomy and agricultural diversification.

Officer (OBE)
Civil division
Arthur Philippe Rault, lately Commissioner of Lands, Ministry of Housing, Lands, and Town and Country Planning.

Member (MBE)
Civil division
Kissoon Lall Dookhit. For voluntary social work.
Dharam-Vir Ghura. For voluntary social work. 
Cassam Mamode Ibrahim. For service to the bus transport industry.
Lallman Jugessur. For voluntary social work.

Imperial Service Order (ISO)
Aloys Joseph Ah Kong, lately Director of Statistics.

Mauritius Police Medal
Marie Joseph Guy Groeme, Superintendent, Mauritius Police Force.
Sahdasseeven Madoorappen, Assistant Superintendent, Mauritius Police Force.
Jean Cyril Sibaly, B.E.M., Superintendent, Mauritius Police Force.

Papua New Guinea

Knight Bachelor
The Honourable Mr. Justice William John Francis Kearney, C.B.E., lately Deputy Chief Justice, Supreme Court
The Reverend Ravu Henao, O.B.E. For services to religion.

Order of Saint Michael and Saint George

Companion (CMG)
Frederick Bernard Carl Reiher. For public service.
Harold Victor Quinton, O.B.E. For services to the cocoa and copra industries.

Order of the British Empire

Dame Commander (DBE)
Civil division
Miss Alice Wedega, M.B.E. Far services to the community.

Commander (CBE)
Civil division
The Honourable Wasangula Noel Levi, M.P. For services to politics and government.
Paul Joseph Quinlivan. For services to the law.

Officer (OBE)
Military division
Colonel Robert Medode Dademo (882213), Papua New Guinea Defence Force.

Civil division
Gabriel Salu Buanam. For public service.
Dr Burton Gyrth Burton-Bradley. For services to mental health.
Arthur Edward Charles, Chief Agronomist.
The Reverend Father Cherubim Dambui. For services to provincial government.
Thomas Edova Fox, Managing Director, Investment Corporation of Papua New Guinea.
The Honourable Akepa Miakwe, M.P. For services to politics and the community.
Alan Eugene Hynes Ross. For services to forestry.

Member (MBE)
Civil division
Peni Bori. For services to the community.
Sop Bubun. For services to the community.
Nakau Iki. For services to the Community.
Jean-Pierre Longayroux. For services to the oil palm industry.
Undi Nando. For services to local and provincial government.
Miss Philomena Cecilia Paru. For public service.
Blasius Raring. For services to the community. 
MjsslrHenao Rarua. Private Secretary to the Prime Minister.
John Sianor. For services to the community. 
Kuluwah Silwau. For services to local and provincial government.
Liba Wadilei. For service to local government.
Balip Yupal. For services to the community.

British Empire Medal (BEM)
Civil division
Duea Arinte. For services to local government. 
Samuel Ganauli. For public service as a driver. 
Pokoraja Mima. For services to the community. 
Andrew Ivarami Suang. For services to the Papua New Guinea Fire Service.
Joseph Toro. For public service in the field of education
Kurarima, Mrs. Ukuma. For services to the community.

Imperial Service Order (ISO)
Mea Vai, Assistant Secretary (Administration and Overseas), Department of Foreign Affairs and Trade.

Queen's Police Medal (QPM)
Jim Airu Napkai, Chief Superintendent, Royal Papua New Guinea Constabulary.

Solomon Islands

Order of the British Empire

Officer (OBE)
Civil division
Dr. John Kere. For services to medicine.
How Yuan Kwan. For services to commerce, industry and shipbuilding.

Member (MBE)
Civil division
Bernard Samuel Ward. For public service. 
John Wheatley. For services to sport.

British Empire Medal (BEM)
Civil division
Edward Bakale. For services to sport.
Kaimanisi Hilasikai.  For services to health safety.
Reginald Kirinwai. For services to commerce.
Hugh Ouou. For services to the community.
Valentine Wale. For services to sport.

Tuvalu

Order of the British Empire

Member (MBE)
Civil division
Frank Hoy, Manager Tuvalu Philatelic Bureau.

British Empire Medal (BEM)
Civil division
Metusela Neia. Member of Public Service Commission.

St Vincent & Grenadines

Order of the British Empire

Officer (OBE)
Civil division
Clarence Lloyd Keizer. For services to the com- munity.
Frank Odel Mason, I.S.O. For services to sport and the community.

Member (MBE)
Civil division
Thomas Augustus Browne. For services to the community.
Carlton Jerome Williams. Chief Agricultural Officer.

Antigua & Barbuda

Order of the British Empire

Officer (OBE)
Civil division
George Hubert Nathaniel Henry. For services to education and to the community.

Member (MBE)
Civil division
Hugh Romel Montgomery Bailey. For services to seamanship and to shipping.
Charles Gordon Sampson. For services to education.

References

Birthday Honours
1982 awards in the United Kingdom